Albion Sports Association Football Club is a football club located in Bradford, West Yorkshire, England, although their current home ground is within the City of Leeds. The club are currently members of the Premier Division of the Northern Counties East League and play at Farsley Celtic's Throstle Nest. The club's kit consists of yellow and royal blue shirts with royal blue shorts and socks.

History
The club was founded in 1974 by Harjit Singh Panesar and Baljit Singh, and joined Division Four of the Bradford Amateur Sunday League, which they won in their first season. They won the Premier Division in 1995–96 and in 1999–2000, a season in which they also won the Bradford Sunday Senior Cup and the British Asian Championship, as well as reaching the final of the FA Sunday Cup, where they lost 1–0 to Hull-based Prestige Brighams. They won the Premier Division again in 2000–01, 2002–03, 2004–05 and 2005–06, as well as reaching the final of the FA Sunday Cup again in 2005, losing 3–2 to Gossoms End of London.

In 2007 the club switched to Saturday football, joining the Bradford League, before switching to the West Riding County Amateur League the following year. They finished second in Division One in 2008–09, earning promotion to the Premier Division. After finishing as runners-up in the Premier Division in 2009–10 and 2010–11, the club were promoted to Division One of the Northern Counties East League.

After missing out on promotion by one point in their first season in the division, in 2012–13 the club won Division One and were promoted to the Premier Division.

Season-by-season record

Honours
Northern Counties East League
Division One champions 2012–13
Bradford Amateur Sunday League:
Premier Division champions 1995–96, 1999–2000, 2000–01, 2002–03, 2004–05, 2005–06
Division Four champions 1974–75
British Asian Championship
 Winners: 1999–2000, 2004–05
Bradford Sunday Senior Cup
Winners: 1986–87, 1990–91, 1995–96, 1996–97, 1999–2000, 2002–03, 2004–05
Bradford District Sunday Cup
Winners 1994–95, 1998–99

Records
Best FA Cup performance: First qualifying round, 2013–14, 2017–18
Best FA Vase performance: Second qualifying round 2012–13, 2013–14, 2014–15

See also
Albion Sports A.F.C. players

References

External links

Football clubs in England
Sport in Bradford
Football clubs in West Yorkshire
1974 establishments in England
Association football clubs established in 1974
Bradford League
West Riding County Amateur Football League
Northern Counties East Football League
Diaspora association football clubs in England
Diaspora sports clubs in the United Kingdom